Kalanpur is a small village in Yamunanagar district in the Indian state of Haryana and it is situated at a distance of 11 km from yamunagar city and 6 km from mustfabad . It is located at 30°09’46.96"N 77°11’4.83"E.
Other villages near kalanpur are kanhari kalan, darajpur, tehi, sialba, mustfabad. Darajpur railway station is situated at a distance of 2 km.
As of 2001 India census, kalanpur had a population of 1032.

Mainly the religions followed are Hinduism and Sikhism and there is a gurudwara and a temple for offering prayers.

References
 https://web.archive.org/web/20100123210642/http://yamunanagar.nic.in/
https://web.archive.org/web/20090804123119/http://yamunanagar.nic.in/bpv_Mus.htm

Villages in Yamunanagar district